Ogbojo is a town in the Adentan Municipality in the Greater Accra Region of Ghana. The town houses the Institute of Local Government Studies.

Nii Torgbor Obodai II is the chief of Ogbojo.

References

Populated places in the Greater Accra Region